Unicorn Hunters is a reality television series that debuted in 2021 on Amazon Prime.

Series overview
The series features a group of investors called the “Circle of Money” and groups of entrepreneurs that pitch their businesses to the group in search of investment funds. The viewing audience also has the ability to invest in the same companies as the investors on the show. Season one consisted of six episodes. The Washington Post has described the series as “the only show that can make you rich”.

Circle of Money

In the shows first season, the members of the Circle of Money included Steve Wozniak, Lance Bass, Moe Vela, Silvina Moschini, Alex Konanykhin, Scott Livingston, and Rosa Rios.

Production
The show was produced by Craig Plestis and premiered on May 10, 2021 on Amazon Prime.

Unicorn Hunters also eventually made a home on the online streaming platform Binge Networks.

Unicoin
In 2022, the founders of the company behind the show developed a cryptocurrency called “Unicoin”. The currency was developed for investors to fund new “high growth” companies according to co-founder Silvina Moschini.

Fellow co-founder Konanykhin has also stated that the “coin was backed by venture capital investments in scaleups”. Companies backing unicoin have included the healthcare company Mymee. By May 2022 Unicoin was invested in five different companies, with $25 million unicoins sold. Owners of unicoin have a stake in the cryptocurrency, but not the companies that the Unicorn Hunters themselves have stakes within.

References

External links
 
 
 
 

2021 American television series debuts
2020s American reality television series
Business-related television series
English-language television shows
Amazon Prime Video original programming